Tindwari is a constituency of the Uttar Pradesh Legislative Assembly covering the city of Tindwari in the Banda district of Uttar Pradesh, India.

Tindwari is one of five assembly constituencies in the Hamirpur (Uttar Pradesh Lok Sabha constituency). Since 2008, this assembly constituency is numbered 232 amongst 403 constituencies.

Election results

2022

2022
Bharatiya Janta Party candidate Ramkesh Nishad won in 2022 Uttar Pradesh Legislative Elections defeating Samajwadi Party candidate Brajesh Kumar Prajapati by a margin of 28,684 votes.

References

External link
 

Assembly constituencies of Uttar Pradesh
Banda district, India